Dryomys is a genus of dormouse. Collectively the members of the genus are referred to as forest dormice, although the type species also goes by the common name forest dormouse.

Species
The species within the genus Dryomys are:
Dryomys laniger – woolly dormouse
Dryomys niethammeri – Balochistan forest dormouse
Dryomys nitedula – forest dormouse

References

 
Rodent genera
Taxa named by Oldfield Thomas
Dormice